Qaleh Rak (also Romanized as Qal‘eh Rāk and Qal‘eh-ye Rāk; also known as Qal‘eh-ye Rāg) is a village in Jahangiri Rural District, in the Central District of Masjed Soleyman County, Khuzestan Province, Iran. At the 2006 census, its population was 54, in 11 families.

References 

Populated places in Masjed Soleyman County